Calhoun Hall (abbreviated CAL) is a building located on the University of Texas at Austin campus, built in 1968. The building is named after John William Calhoun, a mathematics professor, university comptroller from 1925 to 1937, and university president from 1937 to 1939.

References

1968 establishments in Texas
University and college buildings completed in 1968
University of Texas at Austin campus